For the 1995 Vuelta a España, the field consisted of 180 riders; 118 finished the race.

By rider

By nationality

References

 Cyclists
1995